A sega nakade is a 1988 Bulgarian drama film directed by Rangel Vulchanov and written by Georgi Danailov. The film is centres on an actors examination and involves themes of corruption and immorality in important exams.

Release and acclaim
The film premiered on 17 October 1988 in Bulgaria. The film was produced by Boyana Film.

Cast
 Albena Stavreva as Momicheto Krasi s belega (The Scarred Girl Krasi)
 Ani Vulchanova as Svetla
 Antoaneta Stancheva as Nina
 Georgi Enchev as Montyorat (The Mechanic/Fitter)
 Georgi Staykov as Ivan (as Georgi Staikov)
 Genadi Nikolov as Zdravenyakat (The Tough Guy)
 Darina Georgieva as Manekenkata (The Female Model)
 Dimitar Goranov as Blediyat (The Pale Man)
 Elena Arsova as Toni
 Krasimira Miteva as Bremennata (The Pregnant)
 Konstantin Trendafilov as Buntaryat (The Rebel/Malcontent)
 Iliana Kitanova as Pauzata (The Pause)
 Mariana Milanova as Momicheto s okoto (The Boy With the Eye)
 Mihail Bilalov as Sofiyskoto kopele (The Sofia Bastard)
 Mihail Vitanov as Trompetistat (The Trumpeter)

See also
List of Bulgarian films

External links
 

1988 films
1988 drama films
1980s Bulgarian-language films
Bulgarian drama films